La journée aux aventures (The Day of Adventures) is an opera by the French composer Étienne Méhul. It takes the form of an opéra comique in three acts. It was first performed at the Opéra-Comique, Paris on 16 November 1816. The libretto is by Pierre-David-Augustin Chapelle and Louis Mezières-Miot. This was the last of the composer's works to be premiered in his lifetime and was a great success; it enjoyed 66 performances before the end of 1817 and helped remedy the financial problems of the Opéra-Comique. It was revived to acclaim in a German translation in Berlin in December 1839.

Roles

References

Sources
Printed score: La Journée aux Aventures//Opéra Comique en trois Actes et en Prose, Paroles de MM. Capelle et Mézières, Musique de Mr. Méhul..., Paris, Petit, s.d. (accessible for free online at the Internet Archive)
Adélaïde de Place Étienne Nicolas Méhul (Bleu Nuit Éditeur, 2005)
Arthur Pougin Méhul: sa vie, son génie, son caractère (Fischbacher, 1889)
General introduction to Méhul's operas in the  introduction to the edition of Stratonice by M. Elizabeth C. Bartlet (Pendragon Press, 1997)

Operas by Étienne Méhul
1816 operas
Opéras comiques
French-language operas
Operas
Opera world premieres at the Opéra-Comique